William Thompson (1766–1833) was Archdeacon of Cork from 1800 until his death.

Thompson was born in County Fermanagh and educated at Trinity College, Dublin. He was the incumbent at St Peter, Cork.

He married Mary Chetwode, daughter of the Reverend John  Chetwode of Glanmire, County Cork and Elizabeth Hamilton, and sister of the writer Anna Maria Chetwode. They had at least one daughter, Lucy. She married the Reverend John Fitzgerald Day of Beaufort, County Kerry. John was the natural son of Mr Justice Robert Day of the Court of King's Bench (Ireland) and his companion (later his second wife) Mary Fitzgerald of Bandon, County Cork. Lucy and John's daughter Anna married as his second wife Charles Towry-Law, 3rd Baron Ellenborough.

References

Alumni of Trinity College Dublin
Archdeacons of Cork
People from County Fermanagh
18th-century Irish Anglican priests
1766 births
1833 deaths